Jürgen Grabowski (7 July 1944 – 10 March 2022) was a German footballer. He played for Eintracht Frankfurt. He became European champion in 1972 and world champion in 1974. Grabowski is considered the greatest Eintracht Frankfurt player ever.

Biography 

Grabowski was born in Wiesbaden. Grabowski, originally a forward, then later an attacking midfielder or a winger, started his career with SV Biebrich 1919 and FV Biebrich 1902 of Wiesbaden. In 1965 he joined Eintracht Frankfurt. With this team he won the German Cup in 1974 and 1975 and the UEFA Europa League in 1980. Injury prevented him from participating in the 1980 UEFA Cup finals.

In European Cup competitions he made 40 appearances and scored nine goals.

He played 44 caps for the West Germany national team and scored five goals. He was a member of the squad that finished second in the World Cup tournaments of 1966, when he did not play. In Mexico 1970, Grabowski was called the best substitute in the world. In the game against Italy, Grabowski hit the cross to defender Karl-Heinz Schnellinger. The German professional, who played for an Italian club, scored the equalizing goal in the last second. The semi-final game was lost 4–3 after extra time. In 1972,  he became European champion. Grabowski was also participant at the 1974 FIFA World Cup in Germany. In 1974, he scored in West Germany's 4–2 win over Sweden in the second round. On his 30th birthday, he and his Eintracht teammate Bernd Hölzenbein became world champions on 7 July 1974 at the Munich Olympic Stadium.

His career ended in 1980 after he was injured by Lothar Matthäus. For a short time he was manager of Eintracht Frankfurt. Grabowski was honorary captain of Eintracht.

Grabowski lived in Taunusstein, Hesse. In his last years, he was a dialysis patient. He died in Wiesbaden on 10 March 2022, at the age of 77.

Honours 
Eintracht Frankfurt
 UEFA Cup: 1979–80
 DFB-Pokal: 1973–74, 1974–75

West Germany
 FIFA World Cup: 1974
 UEFA European Championship: 1972

Individual
 kicker Bundesliga Team of the Season: 1966–67, 1969–70, 1970–71, 1971–72, 1972–73, 1973–74, 1974–75, 1977–78
 3 December 2014 Hessian Order of Merit

References

Further reading

External links 

 
 

1944 births
2022 deaths
Sportspeople from Wiesbaden
German footballers
Footballers from Hesse
Association football midfielders
Germany international footballers
Germany under-21 international footballers
FIFA World Cup-winning players
UEFA European Championship-winning players
UEFA Cup winning players
1966 FIFA World Cup players
1970 FIFA World Cup players
1974 FIFA World Cup players
UEFA Euro 1972 players
Bundesliga players
FV Biebrich players
Eintracht Frankfurt players
German football managers
Eintracht Frankfurt managers
West German footballers